Fredric King (born March 11, 1958) is an American film producer and director. He has directed and produced documentaries such as Haiti Redux and Swoon: fearless, a film about the artist Caledonia Curry, also known as Swoon.

Early life and education
King grew up in New Orleans, Louisiana. He made his first stop-motion films at age ten and studied filmmaking at Loyola University New Orleans. After spending time in Austin and San Francisco as a cinematographer and video editor for production companies, he moved to New York City.

Career
King was an executive producer of Sound of Metal (2019), which received six nominations at the 93rd Academy Awards, including Best Picture, winning Best Editing and Best Sound. King helped create the film with screenwriter and director Derek Cianfrance.

King produced his first full-length feature film, Quattro Noza, retitled Streets of Legend in 2003. It won the Excellence in Cinematography Award at the 2003 Sundance Film Festival and received two Spirit Award nominations, Best Cinematography and Best First Feature for King. King produced the documentary B.I.K.E., retitled Bike Club, in 2006. The film features Black Label Bike Club, one of the main contributors to the rise of the tall bike culture.

After the 2010 Haiti earthquake, King produced the documentary Haiti Redux. His next documentary was Swoon: fearless. Over the course of two years, King produced a 25-day shoot of an experimental film called Metalhead, which was later retitled Sound of Metal. Currently, King is working on a fantasy-comedy television series called Kurt Vonnegut: Reporter on the Afterlife, adapted from Kurt Vonnegut's novella God Bless You, Dr. Kevorkian.

King has also directed and produced mini-documentaries including AIDSRides, 3-day Breast Cancer Walks, The American Thoracic Society, Solar4PR, and Swoon's Heliotrope Foundation – Konbit Shelter.

Filmography

References

Living people
1958 births
Film directors from Louisiana
Loyola University New Orleans alumni